Major Dundee is a 1965 American Western film directed by Sam Peckinpah and starring Charlton Heston, Richard Harris, Jim Hutton, and James Coburn. Written by Harry Julian Fink, the film is about a Union cavalry officer who leads a contentious troop of Army regulars, Confederate prisoners, and Indian scouts on an expedition into Mexico during the American Civil War to destroy a band of Apaches who have been raiding United States bases and settlements in the New Mexico territory. Major Dundee was filmed in various locations in Mexico. The movie was filmed in Eastman Color by Pathécolor, print by Technicolor.

Plot
During the American Civil War, Union cavalry officer Major Amos Dundee has been relieved of his command for an unspecified tactical error at the Battle of Gettysburg (it is implied that he showed too much initiative) and sent to head a prisoner-of-war camp in the New Mexico Territory. After a family of ranchers and a relief column of cavalry are massacred by an Apache war chief named Sierra Charriba, Dundee sends out his scout Samuel Potts to locate Charriba and begins raising his own unauthorized force. He attempts to recruit Confederate prisoners led by his former friend turned rival from West Point, Captain Ben Tyreen. Tyreen bears a grudge against Dundee and refuses his request. Before the war, Dundee had cast the deciding vote in Tyreen's court-martial from the United States Army for participating in a duel, leading to Tyreen's dismissal from the service and his later becoming an officer in the Confederate Army. Dundee is "southern born" (born and raised in Davidson County, Tennessee) but fought for the Union.

Dundee's recruits include bugler Tim Ryan, who is the only survivor of the massacre, as well as a horse thief, a drunken mule-packer, a vengeful minister, and a small group of black soldiers who are tired of being assigned menial tasks. Dundee reluctantly appoints the inexperienced Lieutenant Graham as his second in command. Eventually, facing a hanging which may or may not be a bluff on Dundee's part, Tyreen accepts Dundee's offer to join him. He binds himself and twenty of his men to loyally serve Dundee, but only until Charriba is "taken or destroyed."

When the diverse factions of Dundee's force are not fighting each other, they engage the Apaches in several bloody battles. Though they rescue several young children captured by the Apaches, Dundee's men lose most of their supplies in an ambush, forcing them to raid a village garrisoned by French troops supporting Emperor Maximilian of Mexico. However there is little to loot, and Dundee ends up sharing some of his dwindling food with the starving Mexicans. Beautiful resident Teresa Santiago, the Austrian widow of a doctor executed for his support of the rebels under Benito Juárez, causes further tensions between Dundee and Tyreen as they compete for her attentions. Dundee intentionally makes it easy for his French prisoners to escape. When they return with reinforcements as he had expected, Dundee surprises the French column in a night attack and makes off with badly needed supplies. After the successful raid, the men of the command begin to get along. However, one of the Confederates, O.W. Hadley, attempts to desert. Dundee is forced to order his execution, which again divides the men.

Teresa and Dundee have a brief affair. In an unguarded moment with her, he is attacked by the Apaches and wounded in the leg, forcing him to seek medical help in French-held Durango. The doctor successfully removes the arrow, but Dundee has to remain in Durango to recuperate. He is tended by a pretty Mexican, whom he eventually takes to bed. When Teresa comes upon them unexpectedly, her relationship with Dundee comes to an abrupt end. Dundee starts drinking heavily as a result. Graham leads a small group of men to sneak into town to distract the French while Tyreen shames Dundee into resuming his mission.

Charriba proves difficult to pin down, so Dundee pretends to give up and starts back for the United States. The Apaches give chase and fall for a trap Dundee carefully laid for them. Charriba is killed by young Bugler Ryan during the ambush. Almost all of the Apaches die in the night battle.

With their bargain concluded Dundee and Tyreen prepare to resume their private vendetta, but the French appear, forcing the two men to set aside their differences. The French having positioned a portion of their force on the American side of the Rio Grande, blocking Dundee's forces from crossing into American territory. Two other columns are coming up fast south of the river. The Americans and the French charge each other, fighting in the river with major loss of life on both sides. Tyreen sees a French soldier seize the regimental colors, and seemingly moved by a patriotism he had thought dead, takes back the captured American flag and hands it over to Dundee – only to be shot in the stomach. With his last strength, he rides off to singlehandedly delay a  detachment of French cavalry while the other Americans cross the Rio Grande. Only Yankees Dundee, Graham, Potts, Ryan, and Sergeant Gomez, plus Confederates Chillum and Benteen and a few other soldiers survive.

As Dundee's force heads home, the narration notes that it is now April 19, 1865. The soldiers are unaware that Lee has surrendered, the Civil War is over, and Abraham Lincoln has been assassinated.

Cast

 Charlton Heston as Major Amos Charles Dundee, a career soldier reluctantly serving as commander of a prison camp
 Richard Harris as Captain Benjamin Tyreen, an Irish immigrant who joins the Confederacy after being court martialed and dismissed as a U.S. Army officer prior to the Civil War
 Jim Hutton as Lieutenant Graham, an inexperienced shavetail artillery officer turned cavalryman
 James Coburn as Samuel Potts, a wily one-armed half-breed mountain man
 Michael Anderson Jr. as Trooper Tim Ryan, the bugler who survived the initial raid and serves as narrator
 Senta Berger as Teresa Santiago, the wife of a murdered Austrian doctor
 Mario Adorf as Sergeant Gomez, Dundee's solid right-hand man and leading sergeant
 Brock Peters as Aesop, leader of a small group of black soldiers stationed at Fort Benlin
 Warren Oates as O.W. Hadley, a Confederate who deserts and is later preemptively executed by Tyreen before Dundee can order it
 Ben Johnson as Sergeant Chillum, Tyreen's right-hand man
 R. G. Armstrong as Reverend Dahlstrom, a local minister out for revenge
 L. Q. Jones as Arthur Hadley, O.W.'s brother
 Slim Pickens as Wiley, a drunken mule-packer
 Dub Taylor as Benjamin Priam, a disheveled horse thief recruited from Fort Benlin's prison
 John Davis Chandler as Jimmy Lee Benteen, a racist rebel who picks a fight with Aesop
 Karl Swenson as Captain Frank Waller, Dundee's second-in-command at Fort Benlin
 Albert Carrier as Captain Jacques Tremaine, commander of the French lancers
 Michael Pate as Sierra Charriba, chief of a tribe of renegade Apaches
 José Carlos Ruiz as Riago, a "Christian Indian" scout whose loyalty is suspect, especially by Bugler Ryan
 Begoña Palacios as Linda, a young Mexican assistant to Teresa who has a brief affair with Ryan
 Aurora Clavel as Melinche, an Indian woman in Durango who nurses Dundee back to health
 Enrique Lucero as Doctor Aguilar, who operates on Dundee in Durango
 Francisco Reiguera as Old Apache, sent to lure Dundee into an ambush

Production

Screenplay
Peckinpah found the script in late 1963. The early draft by Fink focused on Trooper Ryan and presented the film as a typical adventure story. Peckinpah largely discarded this, and working closely with acclaimed screenwriter, Oscar Saul (A Streetcar Named Desire, 1951) began making the movie into a complex character study about Dundee, making him a glory-hungry officer who would do anything to gain fame and recognition. He had the support of Heston, who had seen and enjoyed Peckinpah's previous film, Ride the High Country (1962), and was eager to work with the director. Actor R. G. Armstrong, who had a small part as a Reverend who tags along with the expedition, referred to the 156 minutes version of the film as "Moby-Dick on horseback".

Filming
The production of the movie was very troubled. Peckinpah was often drunk on the set, and was supposedly so abusive towards the cast that Heston had to threaten him with a cavalry saber in order to calm him down: he even charged Peckinpah on horseback at one point, leading the director to panic and order the camera crane he was working on to be raised fast. Peckinpah also fired a large number of crew members for very trivial reasons throughout the shoot. Columbia studio executives feared that the project was out of control, and that Peckinpah was too unstable to finish the picture, so they cut the shooting schedule of the film by several weeks. Heston gave up his entire salary for the film in order to keep Peckinpah on the project – a gesture rarely equaled in Hollywood history. However, while the studio said it forced Peckinpah to wrap up shooting very abruptly, Heston alleged that towards the end Peckinpah simply became drunk and wandered off the set leaving Heston to finish directing the final scenes himself.

Location used in the film included: 

 Chilpancingo, Guerrero, Mexico
 Estudios Churubusco, Mexico City, Distrito Federal, Mexico (studio) (interiors)
 Cuautla, Morelos, Mexico (exteriors)
 Durango, Mexico
 El Saltito waterfall, Nombre de Dios, Durango, Mexico
 Guerrero, Mexico
 La Marquesa National Park, Mexico City, Distrito Federal, Mexico (ranch: Rostes)
 Marquesas, Mexico
 Mescala, Mexico
 Mexico City, Distrito Federal, Mexico
 Morelos, Mexico
 Rio Balsas, Guerrero, Mexico (finale: battle)
 Tehuixtla, Morelos, Mexico (exteriors)
 Tequesquitengo, Morelos, Mexico (exteriors)
 Jonacatepec, Morelos, Mexico
 Tlayacapan, Morelos, Mexico
 Monterrey, Nuevo León, Mexico
 Vista Hermosa, Monterrey, Nuevo León, Mexico (exteriors)

Post-production
The length of Peckinpah's original cut has been disputed. According to some sources, including the 2005 DVD commentary, the original cut was 4 hours 38 minutes long, which was initially edited down to 156 minutes. Included in the unseen longer cuts were several slow-motion battle scenes inspired by Akira Kurosawa's Seven Samurai (1954). The movie was also fairly gory for the standards of 1965, and more bloody and violent scenes were cut out. A bombastic musical score by Daniele Amfitheatrof was added to the film despite Peckinpah's protests, as was the title song, "The Major Dundee March", sung by Mitch Miller and his Sing-Along Gang. One of the most bizarre parts of the score was the use of an electronically altered sound – three anvils of different lengths played-back at half-speed every time Charriba or the Apaches would be seen or even mentioned; "Until the Apache is taken or destroyed" was one of the film's catch phrases.

Themes

The screenplay, by Harry Julian Fink, Oscar Saul, and Peckinpah, was loosely based on historical precedents. However, contrary to claims by the production team at the time, it was not actually based on a true story. The film's novelization was written by Richard Wormser. During the Minnesota Dakota War of 1862, Union forces in that state were forced to recruit Confederate prisoners from Texas to make up for their meager numbers in fighting the Indians. Unlike  the movie, where there is much animosity between the Union and Confederate troops in Dundee's command, the rebels, called "Galvanized Yankees", fought well and without much complaint. Both Union and Confederate forces also battled Apache, Navajo, and Comanche Indians throughout the war along the U.S.-Mexico border, making the scenario of the movie at least somewhat plausible. Before the film's production, Peckinpah had been working on a Custer project, based on the novel by Hoffman Birney The Dice of God, but later abandoned it for this film. (His screenplay was filmed by Arnold Laven, as The Glory Guys).

Critics of the film have also pointed out similarities between this and Herman Melville's classic novel Moby-Dick. Many of the characters are similar to those from that book, with Dundee as Captain Ahab, Tyreen as Starbuck, Ryan as Ishmael, and other minor characters, with Sierra Charriba and his Apache tribe substituting for the whale, as is the general plot line (an obsessive idealist drives himself to destruction, disregarding the effects on others). These references to Moby-Dick were likely intentional on the part of the screenwriters. Some have also pointed out similarities of the plot to the Vietnam War, which are highly unlikely to have been intentional, as the war had not significantly escalated at the time of the film's production.

The opening scene at the Rostes Ranch and the funeral after the first skirmish with the Indians were inspired by scenes from The Searchers, while the scene in which Dundee's troop exits Fort Benlin, each faction of the command singing its own distinct song, is a deliberate parody of an equivalent scene in Fort Apache. The characterization of Dundee, particularly his personality as a martinet and his relationship with Tyreen, has been related to John Wayne's character in Howard Hawks' Red River. The Mexican Civil War setting recalls Robert Aldrich's Vera Cruz. The film also includes several references to David Lean's Lawrence of Arabia – the execution of Hadley, and Dundee's drunken exile in Durango, closely mirror sequences from this film.

The film "seems a direct reaction to [John] Ford's Fort Apache ... with Charlton Heston cast as a more psychotic, more bluntly careerist version of Ford's Lt. Col. Owen Thursday (Henry Fonda)," according to a New York Times review of the film at the time of the 2013 Blu-ray release. Reviewer Dave Kehr went on to write that Peckinpah "plays Heston's square-jawed intransigence against the aristocratic refinement of a Southern officer (overplayed by ... Harris)" and that Peckinpah "would essentially reshape this material into The Wild Bunch four years later, wisely dividing Dundee's divided character into two separate figures" played then by Robert Ryan and William Holden.

Release
The film's disastrous premier was on March 16, 1965, when its running length had been reduced from 136 to 123 minutes after an additional 13 minutes were cut despite the protests of Peckinpah and producer Jerry Bresler. These extra cuts ruined the movie's scope and created significant plot holes, though the plot holes are known to exist in the extended version. Critics universally panned the film but many of their criticisms were addressed in the 2005 restored version.

Restored version
In April 2005, the New York City based Film Forum premiered an "expanded" version featuring several restored scenes, along with a new musical score by Christopher Caliendo. This expanded version was actually the 136-minute cut authorized by producer Jerry Bresler before he left Columbia Studios. Michael Schlesinger, who became head of Columbia's Repertory Division in 1994 asked Asset Management head Grover Crisp about putting the picture back together. Although Crisp initially only found soundless picture trims, he agreed to a search. Finally, he located the missing soundtracks in 2004 and a restoration of the film according to Peckinpah's notes was begun. Despite all of the cuts being edited out of the released version at the last minute, it is highly unlikely that Peckinpah's director's cut will ever be fully restored. In 2005 the restored version of Major Dundee was shown on limited release in selected cities in North America and released on a Region 1 DVD.

Restored scenes are listed below. These include both brief inserts and additions to existing scenes, as well as four major scenes restored to the film.
 Ryan plays "Taps" as soldiers bury the victims of the massacre.
 After Dundee, Potts, and the other Union troopers survey the massacre at the Rostes Ranch, Tyreen and his Confederates attempt to escape through a mountain stream. They are trapped by troops from the fort and Dundee's command. The next scene shows Dundee announcing to the fort's prisoners his need for volunteers. The scene introduces the character of Tyreen, who is only awkwardly introduced in the theatrical version, and provides the reason why he and his men are to hang later in the film (they killed a guard during their escape attempt).
 Tyreen's men refuse to wear the Union jackets provided to them by Dundee.
 Children watch Dundee's expedition leaving Fort Benlin.
 The wrestling match between Potts and the scout Riago is much longer, with Dundee chiding Potts because the artillery bet on him.
 Paco, one of Potts' Indian scouts, is killed by Apaches before the river ambush.
 The fiesta scene in the Mexican village is longer, with Potts leering at a pretty girl, who snubs him (which would have led to the knife fight scene detailed below), and Teresa trying to comfort a crying baby.
 Dundee recovers from his leg wound in Durango, while being tended to by Melinche (Aurora Clavell), eventually falling in love with her.
 Dundee and his officers – Tyreen, Potts, Lt. Graham, and Sgt. Gomez – find an Apache trail marker, and then debate strategy on how to fight Charriba. At the end of the scene, we learn the fate of Apache scout Riago, who had earlier in the film been accused of being an agent of Charriba's by Dundee and others. In the restored version, he is found crucified in a tree. In the theatrical version, his character disappeared without a trace.

Available as extras on the DVD are an unfinished knife fight scene between Potts and Gomez in a Mexican village, a longer version of Teresa and Dundee's interlude at the lake, and several silent outtakes – including a master shot which would have opened the massacre scene at the beginning, of Lt. Brannin and his men riding past a sheep farmer to the Rostes Ranch.

A new score was composed by Christopher Caliendo for the restored version. This score was composed and recorded with a small studio orchestra to authentically sound the way director Peckinpah might have approved it had he been alive at the time of the film's restoration, and the way the music might have been done in its original 1965 release as opposed to today's larger orchestra-type scores. The new score is regarded by some critics as being better than the original, which was disliked by film experts and featured the title song performed by the Mitch Miller Sing-a-Long Gang, though many concede the new music is far from perfect; for example, there has been criticism of Caliendo's decision to leave unscored several sequences which did have music in the original version.

Reception
Although modern reappraisals of the film are generally positive, the reviews for its 1965 theatrical release were negative though they did acknowledge the film's potential. In his review in The New York Times, Eugene Archer wrote that the film had "an interesting cast, a superior visual texture, unexpected bits of character revelation and a choppy continuity that finally negates its impact." He praised Peckinpah for "seeking a fresh approach to the Western" and acknowledged that the director "displays a fine eye for panoramic vistas." Archer concludes:

Many of the flaws identified by film critics in 1965 were addressed in the 2005 restored version, and film reviews of the DVD are much more positive. In his review in Alt Film Guide, Dan Schneider called Major Dundee "a near-great film that has a checkered history" and "likely the most gritty and realistic Western ever made."

The film holds a present-day 97% approval rating based on 32 reviews (with an average rating of 7.3/10) on the review aggregation website Rotten Tomatoes, with the site's critics consensus declaring the film "a Western-type with big war scenes, shot with bombast typical of Sam Peckinpah". Metacritic, another review aggregator, reports a score of 62/100 based on 12 critics, indicating "generally favorable reviews".

The film is recognized by American Film Institute in the 2008 lists: AFI's 10 Top 10, nominated Western Film

Major Dundee helped cement Peckinpah's image as a renegade filmmaker, which he would enhance with the conflicts on his later films, such as The Wild Bunch (1969), Straw Dogs (1971), Pat Garrett and Billy the Kid (1973), and Bring Me the Head of Alfredo Garcia (1974). Others, namely Peckinpah's biographer David Weddle (author in 1994 of If They Move ... Kill 'Em! The Life and Times of Sam Peckinpah), argue that Peckinpah is just as much to blame for the final product as Columbia and Jerry Bresler. Since its release on DVD, Dundee has begun to get recognition and notice from the public at large, and not just Western fans.

See also
List of American films of 1965

References
Notes

Citations

Further reading

External links
 
 
 
 
 Review of the Extended Version

1965 films
1965 Western (genre) films
1960s English-language films
1960s historical films
American Civil War films
American Western (genre) films
Apache Wars films
Columbia Pictures films
Films directed by Sam Peckinpah
Films scored by Daniele Amfitheatrof
Films set in 1864
Films set in 1865
Films set in Mexico
Films set in New Mexico
Films shot in Mexico
Second French intervention in Mexico films
Western (genre) cavalry films
1960s American films